Namea Rural LLG is a local-level government (LLG) of Sandaun Province, Papua New Guinea. The Yellow River languages are spoken in this LLG.

Wards
01. Abrau
02. Alendami
03. Akwom
04. Augom
05. Alai
06. Ameni (Namia language speakers)
07. Iwani (Namia language speakers)
08. Magleri
09. Mantopai
10. Warukori
11. Norambalip
12. Yakaltim (Auwon language speakers)
13. Yegarapi
14. Yilui
15. Edwaki

References

Local-level governments of Sandaun Province